Thapthim krop (literally 'crispy rubies') is one of the best known Thai desserts, having been named one of the world's best 50 desserts by CNN Travel. It is made of cubes of water chestnuts soaked in grenadine or red food dye, then boiled in tapioca flour. This dessert is known as "pomegranate seeds" or "rubies" because of its appearance. It is usually eaten with coconut milk and ice cubes.

See also
 List of Thai desserts
 List of Thai dishes
 List of desserts

References

External links
 

Thai desserts and snacks